The 1972 Newport County Borough Council election was held on Thursday 4 May 1972 to elect councillors to the Newport County Borough Council in Newport, Monmouthshire. It took place on the same day as other district and county borough council elections in England and Wales.

These were the final elections to the county borough council, which would be replaced on 1 April 1974. The previous all-council election took place in May 1971.

The 1972 election saw the Labour Party make major gains.

Background
Newport County Borough was created in 1891 and abolished for 22 years from 1974, following local government reorganisation enacted by the Local Government Act 1972.

Each of the county borough's electoral divisions was represented by three councillors, who stood down in turn for re-election, hence would each sit for a three year term. The council also consisted of 13 aldermen, who were elected by the councillors.

Overview of the result

At this election Labour won nine of the 14 available seats from the Conservative Party and won a further seat held by a Ratepayer councillor. They increased their majority on the Council to 26.

The composition of the Council following the election was 39 Labour members, 12 Conservatives and one Ratepayer.

Ward results
Contests for one of the seats took place in 12 wards, though in Allt-yr-yn two seats were contested.

Alexandra

Allt-yr-yn (2 seats)

Alway

Beechwood

Bettws

Central

Liswerry

Malpas

Ringland

Shaftesbury

St Julians

St Woolos

Victoria

* = 'retiring' ward councillor for re-election

See also
 1973 Gwent County Council election

References

Newport
Council elections in Newport, Wales